Switzerland competed at the 1972 Summer Olympics in Munich, West Germany. 151 competitors, 122 men and 29 women, took part in 116 events in 17 sports.

Medalists

Archery

In the first modern archery competition at the Olympics, Switzerland entered three men but only one woman.  Their highest placing competitor was Lucien Trepper, at 10th place in the men's competition.

Men's Individual Competition:
 Lucien Trepper – 2409 points (→ 10th place)
 Jakob Wolfensberger – 2367 points (→ 22nd place)
 Jean-Pierre Heritier – 2222 points (→ 47th place)

Women's Individual Competition:
 Sally Svendlin – 2191 points (33rd place)

Athletics

Men's 800 metres
Rolf Gysin
 Heat — 1:47.5
 Semifinals — 1:48.2 (→ did not advance)

Men's 1500 metres
Werner Meier
 Heat — 3:43.2 (→ did not advance)

Men's 5000 metres
Fritz Rügsegger
 Heat — 14:54.4 (→ did not advance)

Men's High Jump
Michel Patry
 Qualification Round — 2.09m (→ did not advance)

Boxing

Canoeing

Cycling

Ten cyclists represented Switzerland in 1972.

Individual road race
 Bruno Hubschmid — 19th place
 Iwan Schmid — 20th place
 Ueli Sutter — 24th place
 Hugo Schär — did not finish (→ no ranking)

Team time trial
 Gilbert Bischoff
 Bruno Hubschmid
 Roland Schär
 Ueli Sutter

1000m time trial
 Christian Brunner
 Final — 1:07.71 (→ 7th place)

Individual pursuit
 Xaver Kurmann

Team pursuit
 Martin Steger
 Xaver Kurmann
 René Savary
 Christian Brunner

Diving

Men's 10m Platform
 Sandro Rossi — 225.87 points (→ 35th place)

Equestrian

Fencing

12 fencers, 10 men and 2 women, represented Switzerland in 1972.

Men's épée
 Daniel Giger
 Peter Lötscher
 Christian Kauter

Men's team épée
 Guy Evéquoz, Peter Lötscher, Daniel Giger, Christian Kauter, François Suchanecki

Men's sabre
 Sandor Gombay
 Janos Mohoss
 Istvan Kulcsar

Men's team sabre
 Alain Barudoni, Sandor Gombay, Istvan Kulcsar, Janos Mohoss, Toni Reber

Women's foil
 Fabienne Regamey
 Madeleine Heitz

Gymnastics

Judo

Modern pentathlon

Three male pentathletes represented Switzerland in 1972.

Men's Individual Competition:
 Hans Müller — 4392 points (→ 45th place)
 Beat Ganz — 4323 points (→ 51st place)
 Urs Hugi — 4661 points (→ 28th place)

Men's Team Competition:
 Müller, Ganz, and Hugi — 13359 points (→ 15th place)

Alternate member
Rudolf Steiner

Rowing

Men's Single Sculls
Melchior Bürgin
Heat — 8:00.20
Repechage — 8:04.81
Semi Finals — 8:16.95
Final — 7:31.99 (→ 6th place)

Men's Coxed Pairs
René Furler, Nicolas Lindecker and Stefan Hablützel
Heat — 7:46.03
Repechage — 8:11.53
Semi Finals — 8:32.34
B-Final — 8:05.54 (→ 12th place)

Sailing

Shooting

Eight male shooters represented Switzerland.

25 m pistol
 Paul Buser
 Kurt Rey

300 m rifle, three positions
 Martin Truttmann
 Andreas Beyeler

50 m rifle, three positions
 Erwin Vogt
 Martin Truttmann

50 m rifle, prone
 Erwin Vogt
 Theo Ditzler

Trap
 Paul Vittet
 Vincenzo Lucchini

Swimming

Men's 100m Freestyle
Hanspeter Würmli
 Heat — 55.08s (→  did not advance)

Men's 200m Freestyle
Hanspeter Würmli
 Heat — 2:03.14 (→  did not advance)

Weightlifting

Wrestling

References

Nations at the 1972 Summer Olympics
1972 Summer Olympics
1972 in Swiss sport